The Federal Write-In Absentee Ballot (FWAB) is a write-in ballot for use by overseas American citizens.  Under the Uniformed and Overseas Citizens Absentee Voting Act, the ballot was created for citizens who "have made a timely application for but have not received their regular ballot from the state or territory, subject to certain conditions."  Parts of the act are administered by the Federal Voting Assistance Program.

See also
Absentee ballot

References

External links
Official Federal Voting Assistance Program website
Federal Write-In Absentee Ballot info page for citizens on the FVAP's website
Federal Write-In Absentee Ballot info page for uniformed service members on the FVAP's website
A PDF download of the Federal Write-In Absentee Ballot from the FVAP website

Elections in the United States